Narodna Odbrana (literally, "The People's Defence" or "National Defence") was a Serbian nationalist organization established on October 8, 1908 as a reaction to the Austro-Hungarian annexation of Bosnia and Herzegovina. At the time, it was concerned with the protection of ethnic Serbs in Austria-Hungary. To achieve their goals, the Narodna Odbrana spread propaganda and organized paramilitary forces.

Among the notable founders and members of the organization were Jovan Dučić and Branislav Nušić.

Ideology
At the beginning of the 20th century, the Serbs/Croats/Bosnians throughout the Balkans sought unification under a single state. In addition to the Kingdom of Serbia and the Principality of Montenegro, two states with predominantly ethnic Serb populations that didn't yet share a common border, many more Serbs lived within the borders of neighbouring Austria-Hungary (specifically Bosnia-Herzegovina condominium, Croatia-Slavonia, and southern part of Hungary) as well as Ottoman Empire (Bosnia Vilayet, Kosovo Vilayet, Sanjak of Novi Pazar, and to a lesser extent in parts of Monastir Vilayet and Salonica Vilayet). With the Austria-Hungarian 1908 annexation of Bosnia (where there was a heavy concentration of Serbs) as well as the resulting Annexation Crisis, the Serbs expressed a need for cultural and territorial protection, which gave rise to the Narodna Odbrana.

A 1911 pamphlet named Narodna Odbrana Izdanje Stredisnog Odbora Narodne Odbrane (Народна одбрана издање стредисног одбора народне одбране) focused on six main points:

 Raising, inspiring, and strengthening the sentiment of nationality.
 Registration and enlistment of volunteers.
 Formation of volunteer units and their preparation for armed action.
 Collection of voluntary contributions, including money and other things necessary for the realization of its task.
 Organization, equipment, and training of special revolutionary band (Komitee), destined for special and independent military action.
 Development of activity for the defense of the Serbian people in all other directions.

The pamphlet makes it clear that hatred of Austria-Hungary was not the aim of the group, but instead, it was a natural consequence of the desire for independence and unity within a single nation.

The Central Committee of the Narodna Odbrana was located at Belgrade.

Balkan Wars 

Immediately after annexation of Vardar Macedonia to the Kingdom of Serbia, the Macedonians were faced with the policy of forced serbianisation. The population of Macedonia was forced to declare as Serbs. Those who refused were beaten and tortured. According to the Report of the International Commission to Inquire into the Causes and Conduct of the Balkan Wars, members of the Narodna Odbrana have committed serious war crimes against the civilian population. In Skopje there was a central committee of "National Defense". A population of Skopje called their headquarters "Black House", after the "Black Hand", secret organization that stood behind them. In the "black house" disloyal individuals were taken and beaten.

Members
Stepa Stepanović (president), military
Jovan Dučić (founder), intelligentsia
Branislav Nušić (founder), intelligentsia
Miško Jovanović, student, also Young Bosnia
Božidar Janković, military
Milorad Pavlović
Mladen Stojanović, student, also Young Bosnia
Todor Ilić, student

See also
 Black Hand
 Chetniks
 Pan-Serbism
 Pan-Slavism
 Serbian National Defense Council

References

Sources

External links
 

Kingdom of Serbia
Austro-Hungarian rule in Bosnia and Herzegovina
History of Austria-Hungary
Ottoman period in the history of North Macedonia
Paramilitary organizations based in Serbia
Anti-Bulgarian sentiment
Serbian irredentism
Serbian war crimes in the Balkan Wars
Military units and formations established in 1908
1900s establishments in Serbia
History of the Serbs of Bosnia and Herzegovina
Serbs from the Ottoman Empire
Austria-Hungary–Serbia relations
Serb organizations
Defunct political organizations in Serbia
Serbian nationalism in Bosnia and Herzegovina
Serbian nationalism in North Macedonia
Revolutionary organizations against the Ottoman Empire